Crockham may refer to the following places in England:

Crockham Heath, village in Berkshire
Crockham Hill, village in the Sevenoaks district of Kent